Atlántida may refer to:
Atlantida, a poetic name for the mythical continent of Atlantis
Atlantida (brachiopod), a genus of brachiopods
Atlantida (cave), a karst cave in Ukraine
Atlántida, Uruguay, a town in the department of Canelones, Uruguay
Atlántida Department, an administrative country division in Honduras
Atlántida Sport Club, a football club in Paraguay
Editorial Atlántida, an Argentine publishing house
Atlántida (magazine), a magazine published between 1918 and 1970 by same
Atlantidae, a family of gastropod molluscs
L'Atlàntida, an 1877 Catalan epic poem by Jacint Verdaguer
Atlántida (opera), a 1962 orchestral cantata by Manuel de Falla, based on Verdaguer's poem
Atlantida (novel), a 1919 novel by Pierre Benoit
Atlantida (review), a Portuguese magazine, 1915 to 1920
Atlantida (TV series), Russian television series featuring Nelli Uvarova